The Puerto de la Cruz Lighthouse is an active lighthouse in Puerto de la Cruz on the northern coast of Tenerife in the Canary Islands.
This modern lighthouse is situated within a seafront car park, to the west of the small port in the town.  It is one of seven lighthouses which mark the coastline of Tenerife, and lies between two other modern lighthouses of Punta del Hidalgo to the northeast, and Buenavista to the west.

Description 

The lighthouse was completed in 1995, as part of the maritime lighting plan that was drawn up in the 1980s, which included the need for new lights at a number of locations in the Canaries. These included the contemporary designed lights at Punta del Hidalgo and Buenavista on Tenerife, Castilette on Gran Canaria, and Arenas Blancas and Punta Lava on La Palma.

Its light characteristic is made up of a pattern of two flashes of white light every seven seconds.

The lighthouse is maintained by the Port authority of the Province of Santa Cruz de Tenerife. It is registered under the international Admiralty number D2833 and has the NGA identifier of 113–23842.

See also 

 List of lighthouses in Spain
 List of lighthouses in the Canary Islands

References

External links 

 Comisión de faros
 Autoridad Portuaria de Santa Cruz de Tenerife

Lighthouses in Tenerife
Lighthouses completed in 1995